Karyn Elaine Bryant (born December 23, 1968) is an American actress, writer, and television personality.

Early life
Bryant was born and raised in Boston, Massachusetts. While in Massachusetts, she completed secondary school at Lawrence Academy at Groton, and received a Bachelor's Degrees from Brown University in political science and sociology. She is of Jamaican descent.

Career
Bryant's love of music led to her first television job in 1990, as an MTV VJ. She later hosted a live, daily music program on FX called Sound fX alongside Matt Ostrom and Orlando Jones. Jeff Probst replaced Jones toward the end of the show's run.

Bryant was chosen by TNT to host a series of entertainment vignettes called Rough Cut. The success of the vignettes prompted TNT to turn Rough Cut into a weekly television series hosted and written by Bryant. This marked the beginning of Bryant's professional relationship with Turner Broadcasting. TBS soon launched the wraparound series Movies, For Guys Who Like Movies, allowing Bryant to drive a U.S. Naval LCAC hovercraft, train with Marine snipers and engage in other activities. Lorne Michaels later picked Bryant to host his new daily VH1 game show, Name That Video in 2001; Bryant filmed 50 episodes.

After a brief stint hosting CNN's Talk Back Live, Bryant was chosen to co-anchor CNN's revamped Showbiz Tonight in 2004.

Bryant, a Patriots and Red Sox fan, joined ESPN for their first live New Years Eve show as the countdown to 2006 began. That year, Bryant joined the Showtime Championship Boxing announcer team with Steve Albert, Al Bernstein and Jim Gray. In May 2008, Bryant was invited by CBS to join their Elite Xtreme Combat announcer team for their new primetime mixed martial arts programming, debuting mixed martial arts for the first time on primetime network television May 31, 2008. Bryant also co-owns MMAheat.com which covers most mixed martial arts sporting events.  MMA H.E.A.T. (the show) is a half-hour sports and entertainment podcast that Bryant writes and anchors ("H.E.A.T." stands for "Heart. Endurance. Aggression. Technique."). She currently co-hosts most of the UFC Pre and Post shows on ESPN.

TV appearances

Hosting
Awake on the Wild Side – MTV
Weekend Blastoff – MTV
Buzzcut – MTV
Like We Care – MTV
Sound FX – FX
Rough Cut – TNT
Movies, For Guys Who Like Movies – TBS
Name That Video – VH1
Junkyard Wars – TLC (TV channel)
For Love or Money – Reunion Special – NBC
Showbiz Tonight (2005) – CNN
ESPN's New Year's Eve Special, Live From Times Square, New York City (2005) – ESPN
Showtime Championship Boxing (2006–2009) – Showtime
Elite Xtreme Combat (2008) – CBS
Cindy Crawford Meaningful Beauty skin care – infomercial
MMA H.E.A.T. (2009–present)
UFC Now

Recurring roles
Malcolm and Eddie
Sliders

References

External links

Official website
Official website (MMA H.E.A.T.)

American game show hosts
American infotainers
American television actresses
American television journalists
American television talk show hosts
Brown University alumni
Living people
Actresses from Boston
VJs (media personalities)
Mixed martial arts broadcasters
1968 births
American people of Jamaican descent
American women non-fiction writers
American women television journalists
Fox Sports 1 people
21st-century American women